Product naming is the discipline of deciding what a product will be called, and is very similar in concept and approach to the process of deciding on a name for a company or organization. Product naming is considered a critical part of the branding process, which includes all of the marketing activities that affect the brand image, such as positioning and the design of logo, packaging and the product itself.
The process involved in product naming can take months or years to complete. Some key steps include specifying the objectives of the branding, developing the product name itself, evaluating names through target market testing and focus groups, choosing a final product name, and finally identifying it as a trademark for protection.

Principles
A key ingredient in launching a successful company is the selection of its name.
Product names that are considered generally sound have several qualities in common.

They strategically distinguish the product from its competitors by conveying its unique positioning
They hold appeal for the product's target audience
They imply or evoke a salient brand attribute, quality or benefit.
They are available for legal protection and "trademark".
They allow companies to bond with their customers to create loyalty.
They have a symbolic association that fortifies the image of a company or a product to the consumers.
They help motivate customers to buy the product.
They can be legally acquired and developed.

Types of names
Brand names typically fall into several different categories.

Acronyms and Abbreviations
AFLAC, IBM, M&M (for Forrest Mars and Bruce Murrie).

Amalgam
Names created by taking parts of words and putting them together: Nabisco (National Biscuit Company).

Alliteration and Rhyme
Fun to say, and particularly memorable: FAT BAT, YouTube, Piggly Wiggly.

Appropriation
Use the idea for one thing and apply it to another: Caterpillar, Reebok.

Descriptive
Descriptive names ascribe to the product a characteristic: Toys R Us, General Motors.

Clever Statement
Names don't have to be just a word or two: Seven for All Mankind, I Can't Believe It's Not Butter!, The Boring Company.

Evocative
Invoke a vivid image that alludes to a brand benefit: London Fog, Amazon.

Founders' Names (Eponyms)
Use the name of a founder or founder family member: Barneys, Hewlett-Packard, and Wendy's.

Geography
Chose a name associated with company/product location: eBay for Echo Bay (a fictional place as well as the shortened form of "Echo Bay Technology Group," the name of eBay founder Pierre Omidyar's consulting company, according to the List of company name etymologies), Fuji for the tallest mountain in Japan, Cisco for San Francisco.

HomeNON
For a name with personality: Yahoo!, Cracker Jack.
For example, Yahoo comes from Gulliver's Travels by Jonathan Swift, where Yahoo is a legendary being with the following characters: rude, unsophisticated, uncouth. Later the name Yahoo was popularized as an bacronym for Yet Another Hierarchical Officious Oracle.

Ingredients
Base the name on ingredients: Clorox for chlorine plus sodium hydroxide, Pepsi for the digestive enzyme pepsin.

Merged
When two companies merge into one, sometimes both names are kept: ExxonMobil, Cadbury Schweppes, GlaxoSmithKline.

Mimetics
Use alternative spellings for common sounds: 2(x)ist, Krispy Kreme.

Nickname
Use a founder's nickname: Adidas aka Adolf Dassler, Haribo Hans Riegel Bonn, Kinkos.

Neologism
A completely new made-up word: Kodak, Verizon, Mimex.

Onomatopoeia
Use a sound associated with a product function or other brand idea: Twitter, Meow Mix.

Personification
Create a character or adopt an existing personage: Green Giant, Nike, Midas Mufflers.

Portmanteau
Name is a combination of two (or more) words or morphemes, and their definitions, into one new word: Travelocity, Pinterest.

Product naming techniques
Linguistically, names are developed by combining morphemes, phonemes, and syntax to create a desired representation of a product.

Morphemes differ from words in that many morphemes may not be able to stand alone. The Sprint name is composed of a single word and a single morpheme. Conversely, a brand like Acuvue is composed of two morphemes, each with a distinct meaning. While "vue" may be able to stand as its own word, "acu" is seen as a prefix or a bound morpheme that must connect to a free morpheme like "vue."

Phonemes are minimal units of sound. Depending on the speaker's accent, the English language has about 44 phonemes. In product naming, names that are phonetically easy to pronounce and that are well balanced with vowels and consonants have an advantage over those that are not. Likewise, names that begin with or stress plosive consonant sounds B, hard C, D, G, K, P or T are often used because of their attention-getting quality. Some phoneme sounds in English, for example L, V, F and W are thought of as feminine, while others such as X, M and Z are viewed as masculine.

Syntax, or word order, is key to consumers' perceptions of a product name. Banana Republic would not carry the same meaning were it changed to "Republic Banana." Syntax also has significant implications for the naming of global products, because syntax has been argued to cross the barrier from one language to another. (See the pioneering work on Universal Grammar by Noam Chomsky)

Some specific product naming techniques, including a combination of morphemes, phonemes and syntax are shown in the graph below.

Owning a name: Trademarks, URLs and beyond

A consideration companies find important in developing a product name is its "trademarkability". Product name trademarks may be established in a number of ways:

 In many countries, including the United States, names can be used as trademarks without formal registration through first use or common law—simply to protect an established product's name and reputation.
 Product names can be formally registered within a state, with protection limited to that state's borders.
 In the United States, a federal trademark registration is filed with the USPTO and offered protection for as long as the mark is in use.
 The preeminent system for registering international trademarks in multiple jurisdictions is the Madrid system.

In addition, protecting a trademark is just as important as the initial process of registration. Trademark rights are maintained through actual use of the trademark, and will diminish over time if a trademark is not actively used.

Companies need to consider whether they can own a name in the digital realm. Securing a domain name, particularly with the globally recognized dot-com extension, is critical for some companies.  It has also become increasingly important for firms to interact with their audience through social media websites.  Social media sites like Facebook, Twitter, Pinterest and Instagram all have procedures for acquiring a name on their sites. In modern communication, the trademark is just the start of owning a name.

International considerations
Because English is widely viewed as a global language, with over 380 million native speakers, many international trademarks are created in English. Still, language differences present difficulties when using a trademark internationally.

Product naming faux pas
Many companies have stumbled across the importance of considering language differences in marketing new products.
Audi named their hybrid models e-tron,  meaning "excrement" in French.
The Mitsubishi Pajero SUV is called Montero in Spanish-speaking countries as pajero is a commonly used as a pejorative to mean "wanker".
Reebok named a women's sneaker Incubus. In medieval folklore, an incubus was a demon who ravished women in their sleep.
The Honda Fitta was, according to a popular urban legend, renamed Jazz after discovering that fitta is Norwegian and Swedish slang for the female genitals.
A drink in Japan called Calpis, when pronounced, sounds like cow piss. The product is marketed in North America under the Calpico brand.
Bimbo is a Mexican baking conglomerate; in English the term describes a woman who is physically attractive but is perceived to have a low intelligence or poor education.

See also
Onomastics, the science of proper names (including names for products, companies, etc.)
Brand architecture
Brand development
Corporate identity
List of company name etymologies
List of renamed products
Naming
Naming firms
Product naming convention
Project code name
Rebranding
Seasonal packaging

References

External links
Importance of a brand name
What Entrepreneurs Need to Know About ... Naming Your Company, Innovation Magazine, October 2006.
Choosing a Company Name, The Sideroad, 2006.
8 Mistakes to Avoid When Naming Your Business, Entrepreneur.com 7 April 2005
Venture Capital: Renaming company entails risks, by JOHN COOK, SEATTLE POST-INTELLIGENCER, February 28, 2003
Monday name change for PwC, BBC NEWS, 10 June 2002
"What's in a name? For the pros, big bucks", U.S. News and World Report, 10/13/97
"Change your business' name? 7 issues," Microsoft Small Business Center
small business resource for product naming IYBI 2013
In the name of the brand, m+a report 2008
The 2017 Igor Naming Guide

Product management
Brand management
Naming